Erin Walter (born November 28, 1983) is an American soccer midfielder who last played for Saint Louis Athletica of Women's Professional Soccer. She decided to retire due to hip injuries after two seasons with Saint Louis Athletica.

References

External links
 DePaul profile

Living people
Saint Louis Athletica players
1983 births
DePaul Blue Demons women's soccer players
Women's association football midfielders
American women's soccer players
Women's Professional Soccer players